The IFSC Climbing World Championships are the biennial (i.e. held once every two years) world championship event for competition climbing that is organized by the International Federation of Sport Climbing (IFSC). This event determines the male and female world champions in the three disciplines of sport climbing: lead climbing, bouldering, and speed climbing. Since 2012, a Combined ranking is also determined, for climbers competing in all disciplines, and additional medals are awarded based on that ranking.  The first event was organized in Frankfurt in 1991.

History

Creation and organisers 
In 1991, the Union Internationale des Associations d'Alpinisme (UIAA) organized the first climbing championships. The International Council for Competition Climbing (ICC) was created in 1997 as an internal body of the UIAA to take charge of competitions.

In 2007, the independent IFSC was created as a continuation of the ICC to govern competition climbing.

Events 
The present format has four disciplines: lead, speed, bouldering, and combined.

The first championships had two events: lead and speed. Bouldering was added in 2001.

In 2012, 2014 and 2016, a combined ranking (sometimes also called overall ranking) was computed for climbers participating in all of the three events. In 2018, a specific combined event was included which the six climbers with highest overall ranking were invited to enter. The combined event requires athletes to compete in all three disciplines, and they receive a single combined score based on all three results. Scores achieved in single-discipline events are not relevant to the combined score, and there are no awards for any one part of the combined event. The 2018 combined event tested the new Olympic Games format, which will be used at the first appearance of climbing at the Olympics in 2020. In 2019 the Combined competition was held again with the best eight men's and women's athletes receiving invitations to the 2020 Olympics. 

Paraclimbing was introduced at the 2012 World Championships, but from 2019 it became its own championship, the IFSC Paraclimbing World Championships.

Years 
The World Championships are held every two years. Twice, the cycle has been moved to the other year and in those cases this was done by holding the next championship one year earlier. In 2012 the World Championships were shifted to even years to avoid interference with the 2013 World Games climbing event and to give a supplementary opportunity to demonstrate the sport for a possible integration into the 2020 Olympic Games. In 2019 the World Championships were again held one year early, to now allow the Championships to be the year before each Olympics to operate as a qualifier event.

Championships

Medals 
As of 2021 IFSC Climbing World Championships (excluding paraclimbing medals)

Note 1: share medals in 2007 IFSC Climbing World Championships

Note 2: one silver medal in 2021 IFSC Climbing World Championships for Climbing Federation of Russia

Men's results

Lead

Speed

Bouldering

Combined

Women's Results

Lead

Speed

Bouldering

Combined

See also 
 International Federation of Sport Climbing
 IFSC Climbing World Cup
 IFSC Paraclimbing World Championships
 IFSC Climbing World Youth Championships
 IFSC Climbing European Championships
 IFSC Climbing Asian Championships
 Best IFSC results

References

External links 
 
 

 
Climbing competitions
Sport climbing